Jussara Marques de Almeida (born 11 December 1973) is a Brazilian computer scientist whose research involves social computing, including web caches, user modeling, and the analysis of workload patterns arising from user interactions. She is an associate professor of computer science at the Federal University of Minas Gerais.

Education and career
Almeida earned bachelor's and master's degrees in computer science at the Federal University of Minas Gerais, in 1994 and 1997 respectively. She continued her graduate study at the University of Wisconsin–Madison, earning a second master's degree in 1999 and completing her Ph.D. in 2003. Her dissertation, Streaming Content Distribution Networks with Minimum Delivery Cost, was supervised by Mary K. Vernon.

She returned to the Federal University of Minas Gerais as an assistant professor in 2004, and became an associate professor in 2012.

Recognition
Almeida was an affiliate member of the Brazilian Academy of Sciences from 2011 to 2015.

References

External links
Home page

1973 births
Living people
Brazilian computer scientists
Brazilian women computer scientists
Federal University of Minas Gerais alumni
University of Wisconsin–Madison alumni
Academic staff of the Federal University of Minas Gerais